= Paola Ríos Germán =

Paola Ríos Germán is a Spanish geriatrician and author living in Madrid.

== Early life and education ==
Ríos Germán received a master's degree in public health from the National School of Health in 2017, then a master's in palliative care from the University of Salamanca after training in geriatrics at La Paz University Hospital. In 2024, Ríos Germán completed her doctoral thesis at the Autonomous University of Madrid.

== Career ==
Ríos Germán founded Geriatría Contigo. She is the physician at the Center for the Prevention of Cognitive Deterioration of the City of Madrid. She is also a specialist in preventative medicine and public health at the Toledo Hospital.

Since 2019 she has been a researcher with the National Hip Fracture Registry.

Ríos Germán is the member of the Spanish, Madrid and American Geriatric Societies as well the Spanish Society of Geriatric Medicine.
